Arnold Droz-Farny (12 February 1856 – 14 January 1912) was a Swiss mathematician, professor in High School of Porrentruy (near Basel).

Life and work 
Arnold Droz changed his family name later in his life when he married Lisa Farny. He studied in the high school of Neuchâtel and then in the Technical School of Stuttgart and in the university of Munich. After graduating in mathematics in Munich, he began to teach in a private school. Soon, in 1880, he was appointed to the chair of mathematics in the Lycée Cantonal of Porrentruy, where he remained till 1908 when his ill health forced him to retire.

In mathematical world he is known by a theorem, the Droz-Farny line theorem, stated by him in 1899, without proof, in an answer to question 14111 in the journal The Educational Times.

Droz-Farny was also an amateur numismatic collector who published some articles on historical remarks of some coins and, after his death, he donated his collection to the cantonal authorities.

References

Bibliography

External links 
 

19th-century Swiss mathematicians
20th-century Swiss mathematicians
1856 births
1912 deaths